Wild West City is a Wild West theme park based on 1880s Dodge City, Kansas, located in Stanhope, New Jersey.

In popular culture
The park was used as a filming location for The Whitest Kids U' Know season 3, episode 3 sketch "Water Balloons".

References

External links

1957 establishments in New Jersey
Amusement parks in New Jersey
Amusement parks opened in 1957
Western (genre) theme parks
Stanhope, New Jersey
Tourist attractions in Sussex County, New Jersey